Goodwill Plantation is a historic plantation and national historic district located near Eastover, Richland County, South Carolina. The district encompasses 10 contributing buildings and two contributing structures. They include the millpond and a portion of the canal irrigation system (c. 1827); the overseer's house (c. 1857); the 2-1/2-story frame mill building (c. 1857 – 1870); two slave cabins (c. 1858); a blacksmith shop; the late-19th century  main house; a lodge  (c. 1910 – 1935); and a carriage house, tenant house, barn and corn crib.

The plantation was added to the National Register of Historic Places in 1986.

References

Plantations in South Carolina
Farms on the National Register of Historic Places in South Carolina
Historic districts on the National Register of Historic Places in South Carolina
Buildings and structures in Richland County, South Carolina
National Register of Historic Places in Richland County, South Carolina
1857 establishments in South Carolina
Slave cabins and quarters in the United States